The Tupolev Tu-126 (NATO reporting name: Moss) was an airborne early warning and control aircraft developed from the Tupolev Tu-114 airliner by the Tupolev design bureau. It was in service with the armed forces of the Soviet Union from 1965 to 1984.

Design and development
In 1958 increasing concern over the threat of an American nuclear strike against the USSR from the north led to a new requirement for an airborne radar system, which would avoid the problems and expense of attempting to create a land-based radar system to cover all of the enormous Soviet northern coast. The Tupolev Design Bureau was ordered to design an AEW&C aircraft. After trying to fit the projected radar instrumentation in a Tu-95 and a Tu-116, a decision was made to use the Tupolev Tu-114 with its wider fuselage instead. This solved problems with cooling and operator space that existed with the narrower Tu-95 and Tu-116 designs. To adhere to the flight range requirements, the plane was fitted with an air-to-air refuelling probe. The Tu-126 had a crew of 12 and carried the Liana radar (NATO reporting name Flap Jack) in a rotodome mounted above the fuselage. It had no look-down capability, so the switch by NATO to low level penetration made it fairly irrelevant.

The first prototype Tu-126 flew on 23 January 1962.  Testing, which continued through the autumn of 1964, showed that while the radar was effective over water, performance was poorer over land. It was also found that the large contra-rotating propellers of the four engines seriously compromised the performance of the radar. This problem was only marginally countered by the installation of a new radar called Shmel.

Operational history

The Tu-126 entered service in 1965, although it was only identified by Western intelligence in 1968 after appearing in a Soviet documentary film.  Eight production aircraft were built in addition to the prototype from between 1965 and 1968 and all were nominally based at Šiauliai Air Base. Western intelligence estimated that its radar performance was inferior to Western equivalents, that it was unable to detect cruise missiles or small aircraft at low level. However, it was assessed that the Tu-126 had powerful jamming equipment. The Tu-126 was used by the Soviet Air Force, until being replaced by the Beriev A-50. The last Tu-126 was retired in 1984.

Operators

 Soviet Air Forces
 Soviet Air Defence Forces

 Egyptian Air Force
 Indian Air Force

Specifications (Tu-126)

See also

References

Notes

Bibliography

 Duffy, Paul and Kandalov, Andrei. Tupolev: The Man and His Aircraft. Shrewsbury, UK: Airlife, 1996. .
 Gunston, Bill. The Osprey Encyclopedia of Russian Aircraft 1875–1995. London: Osprey, 1995. .
 Taylor, John W.R., ed. Jane's All The World's Aircraft 1988–89. Coulsden, Surrey, UK: Jane's Information Group, 1988. .

Yefim Gordon, Dmitriy Kommisarov: Flight Craft 6: Il'yushin/Beriyev A-50. Pen & Sword Books Ltd, 2015,

External links

 Tu-114 in Museum of Civilian Aviation, Ulyanovsk, Russia

Tu-0126
1960s Soviet special-purpose aircraft
Four-engined tractor aircraft
Low-wing aircraft
AWACS aircraft
Aircraft with contra-rotating propellers
Four-engined turboprop aircraft
Aircraft first flown in 1962